9½ Weeks is a 1986 American erotic romantic drama film directed by Adrian Lyne, and starring Kim Basinger and Mickey Rourke. Basinger portrays a New York City art gallery employee who has a brief yet intense affair with a mysterious Wall Street broker, played by Rourke. The screenplay by Sarah Kernochan, Zalman King and Patricia Louisianna Knop is adapted from the 1978 memoir of the same name by Austrian-American author Ingeborg Day, under the pseudonym "Elizabeth McNeill".

The film was completed in 1984, but did not get released until February 1986. Considered too explicit by its American distributor Metro-Goldwyn-Mayer, the film was heavily edited for release in the United States, where it was a box office bomb, grossing $6.7 million on a $17 million budget. It also received mixed reviews at the time of its release. However, its soundtrack sold well and the film itself became a huge success internationally in its unedited version, particularly in Australia, Canada, France, Germany, and the United Kingdom, making $100 million worldwide. It has also acquired a large fanbase on video and DVD and has developed a cult following.

Plot 
Elizabeth McGraw, an employee at a SoHo art gallery, meets John Gray, a Wall Street arbitrageur, at a Chinese grocer and later at a street fair where he buys her an expensive scarf. They start dating, but John's strange behavior escalates, and he gives her an expensive gold watch with instructions to think about him touching her at noon every day. Elizabeth goes further and masturbates at work at the designated time.

Elizabeth wants to introduce John to her friends, but he only wants to see her in the evenings and tells her to see her friends during the day. One evening, she's left alone in his apartment and finds a photo of him with another woman named April Tover. When John calls and asks if she went through his things, she admits it. He threatens to punish her, and when he returns home, he orders her to face the wall for a spanking. Elizabeth tries to leave, but the door is locked. John slaps her, she slaps him back, and he rapes her.

John takes control of all aspects of Elizabeth's life, from what she wears and eats to how he brushes her hair and feeds her. Elizabeth becomes increasingly dependent on John, losing her sense of self. One day, she follows John to work and brings him lunch, telling him she wants to "be one of the guys." John arranges for her to crossdress for a rendezvous at a bar, but they're mistaken for a gay couple and attacked. Elizabeth stabs one of the attackers in the buttocks, and they flee. Excited from the incident, Elizabeth declares her love for John, and they have passionate sex at the scene of the crime.

John starts to make their BDSM-style relationship more apparent in public. At a bed store, he asks Elizabeth to "spread your legs for daddy" in front of the saleswoman. At an equestrian store, he whips Elizabeth on the leg with a riding crop and tells the salesman, "I'll take this one." At his apartment, John asks Elizabeth to crawl on the floor and pick up money as he throws it on the ground. Elizabeth initially obliges but then protests, and John takes off his belt, whipping items in the apartment. Elizabeth cries and protests, but John continues to insist that she crawl and pick up the money. She eventually does so before throwing the money in John's face and declaring that she hates the game.

Elizabeth is confident and sexy at home with John, but she becomes withdrawn at work and thinks about her previous lover. She goes to the countryside to visit an artist named Farnsworth and secure an exhibit.

Elizabeth meets John at a hotel room and is asked to wear a blindfold. John touches her briefly before a woman enters the room and caresses Elizabeth as John observes. Elizabeth shows anxiety and the woman removes her blindfold. John takes the woman to the next room and starts undressing her. Elizabeth intervenes violently and flees with John in pursuit. They end up in an adult entertainment venue where Elizabeth starts kissing the man next to her. John approaches her and they embrace.

Elizabeth's gallery hosts a successful opening featuring Farnsworth's work. Farnsworth, uncomfortable with the partying crowd, finds Elizabeth in tears in a corner. Elizabeth, dependent on John for emotional stability, calls him while wearing a metal bracelet cuff. The next morning, Elizabeth tries to leave John's apartment, but he tries to convince her to stay by confessing his feelings. Elizabeth leaves anyway, and John begins a mental countdown, hoping she will return before he finishes. The film ends with Elizabeth walking among the crowd, crying.

Cast

Production

Casting
Kim Basinger said the audition was grueling - she was called upon to act like a prostitute groveling for money in an elaborate sexual game devised by the male protagonist. Basinger said she left the audition crying and feeling humiliated. She told her agent that she never wanted to hear about the film again and would definitely not do it even if she were chosen. When she returned home, she found two dozen roses with a card from Adrian Lyne and Mickey Rourke. Lyne continued to pursue her for the part and eventually she changed her mind and decided to take it on.

Source material for the film
The film was a significant departure from the much darker tone of the novel it was based upon. In 9½ Weeks: A Memoir of a Love Affair, John engages in criminal behavior and coerces Elizabeth into committing a violent mugging in an elevator. The book culminates in a quasi-rape scenario that leaves an increasingly permissive Elizabeth in mental anguish, and he takes her to a mental hospital–never to return to her again. The film ends on a somber tone, and there is no mention of the psychiatric breakdown that John inflicted upon her, though her mental anguish is frequently implied, especially near the end of the film.

Music 
The main single released from the  Weeks: Original Motion Picture Soundtrack was "I Do What I Do", performed by Duran Duran bass guitarist John Taylor, giving his first solo singing performance during a hiatus in Duran Duran's career. The song reached No. 23 on the Billboard Hot 100 and #42 on the UK Singles Chart. Music for the score was composed by Taylor and Jonathan Elias. Original music for the movie was also written by Jack Nitzsche, but his compositions are not included on the soundtrack.

The soundtrack also included tracks from Luba, Bryan Ferry, Dalbello, Corey Hart, Joe Cocker ("You Can Leave Your Hat On"), Devo, Eurythmics and Stewart Copeland. Winston Grennan's reggae "Savior" as well as Jean Michel Jarre's "Arpegiateur", played during the sex scene on the stairs in the rain, were not included on the record.

Release

Home media 
In 1998, MGM Home Entertainment released an "uncut, uncensored version" on DVD that was 117 minutes. The film was released by Warner Home Video on Blu-ray in the United States on March 6, 2012.

Reception

Critical response 
 Weeks has a 60% rating on Rotten Tomatoes, based on 25 reviews. The critical consensus reads: "9 1/2 Weeks''' famously steamy sex scenes titillate though the drama unfolding between the beddings is relatively standard for the genre". Audiences polled by CinemaScore gave the film an average grade of "C−" on an A+ to F scale.

The film was championed by some critics. Roger Ebert praised the film, giving it three and a half stars out of four, stating: "A lot of the success of  Weeks is because Rourke and Basinger make the characters and their relationship convincing". He further elaborated by saying that their relationship was believable, and unlike many other characters in other erotic films at that time, the characters in this movie are much more real and human.

Over time, some critics have warmed to the film and audiences gave it somewhat of a legacy thanks to its success in the rental market. It performed very well in Europe, particularly in Italy, France and also in Latin America. Its success in France was so strong that it played for five years at a Paris cinema, earning approximately $100 million. In São Paulo, Brazil, it played for 30 months in the cult movie house Cine Belas Artes from 1986 to 1989.

 Accolades 
The film was nominated for three categories at the 1986 Golden Raspberry Awards, Worst Actress (Kim Basinger, who lost to Madonna for Shanghai Surprise), Worst Original Song ("I Do What I Do" by Jonathan Elias, John Taylor, Michael Des Barres, which lost to "Love or Money" from Under the Cherry Moon), and Worst Screenplay (Patricia Louisianna Knop, Zalman King, Sarah Kernochan, which lost to Howard the Duck). The film gained a huge following on home video, and in spite of its reception, both Basinger and Rourke became huge stars.

Year-end lists
The film is recognized by American Film Institute in these lists:
 2002: AFI's 100 Years...100 Passions – Nominated

 Cultural impact 
 The film was the inspiration behind the band Soda Stereo's 1986 song "Persiana Americana".
 The film was the inspiration behind J-pop singer Akina Nakamori's 1986 album Cross My Palm and K-pop singer Sunmi's 2018 release "Heroine".
 The film was mentioned in Joaquín Sabina's song "Y si amanece por fin" from his 1990 album Mentiras Piadosas.

Related films
In 1997, a sequel titled Love in Paris was released direct-to-video. It stars Rourke and Angie Everhart and was directed by Anne Goursaud.

In 1998, a prequel titled The First 9½ Weeks starred Paul Mercurio and Clara Bellar. It was a straight-to-video film.

A parody of the original film,  Ninjas!'', was released in 1991.

See also 

 Sex in film

References

Bibliography

External links 
 
 
 
 

1986 films
1980s English-language films
1980s Spanish-language films
1980s erotic drama films
1986 romantic drama films
American erotic drama films
American erotic romance films
American romantic drama films
BDSM in films
Films scored by Jack Nitzsche
Films based on non-fiction books
Films directed by Adrian Lyne
Films produced by Sidney Kimmel
Films set in Brooklyn
Films set in New York City
Films shot in New York City
Metro-Goldwyn-Mayer films
1980s American films